Parmena balearica is a species of beetle in the family Cerambycidae. It was described by Vives in 1998. It is known from the Balearic Islands.

Subspecies
 Parmena balearica balearica Vives, 1998
 Parmena balearica minoricensis Vives, 1998

References

Parmenini
Beetles described in 1998